Hemingway is a surname of English (particularly West Yorkshire, especially Halifax Southowram origin. The best-known Hemingway is American writer Ernest Hemingway.

Other notable people with the surname include:
 Anthony Hemingway, American film and television director
 Cyril Hemingway, English footballer
 Dave Hemingway (born 1960), British musician
 Dree Hemingway (born 1987), American model and actress
 Frank Hemingway, rugby league footballer of the 1930s, 1940s and 1950s
 George Hemingway (1872–1907), English cricketer
 George Hemingway (born 1947), chairman of Budapest Honvéd FC
 Gerry Hemingway (born 1955), American jazz composer and percussionist
 Gloria Hemingway (1931–2001), American doctor, third and youngest child of Ernest Hemingway (born Gregory Hemingway)
 Gregory Hemingway (1931–2001), see Gloria Hemingway, 
 Hilary Hemingway, American author, niece of Ernest Hemingway
 Jack Hemingway (1923–2000), first son of Ernest Hemingway
 John Hemingway (born 1960), American author, grandson of Ernest Hemingway
 Junior Hemingway (born 1988), American football player
 Leicester Hemingway (1915–1982), American writer, brother of Ernest Hemingway
 Lorian Hemingway (born 1951), American writer, granddaughter of Ernest Hemingway
 Lynn Hemingway (born 1945), Utah State representative
 Maggie Hemingway (1946–1993), British novelist
 Margaux Hemingway (1955–1996), American actress, granddaughter of Ernest Hemingway
 Mariel Hemingway (born 1961), American actress, granddaughter of Ernest Hemingway
 Mary Welsh Hemingway (1908–1986), American journalist, fourth wife of Ernest Hemingway
 Matt Hemingway (born 1972), 2004 Olympic Silver Medalist in the High Jump
 Nick Hemingway (born 1976), British record producer
 Patrick Hemingway (born 1928), second son of Ernest Hemingway
 Peter Hemingway (1929–1995), English architect
 Rose Hemingway (born 1984), American actress, performer and singer
 Thomas Hemingway, American Brigadier General, military lawyer 
 Tom Hemingway (born 1986), English rugby player 
 Toby Hemingway (born 1983), British actor
 Wayne Hemingway (born 1961), English fashion designer
 William Hemingway (1873–1967), English cricketer